The Des Moines Open is a defunct USLTA Indoor Circuit affiliated men's tennis tournament played from 1971 to 1973. It was held at the Veterans Memorial Auditorium in Des Moines, Iowa in the United States and played on indoor carpet courts in February.

Past finals

Singles

Doubles

References

External links
 ATP 1971 results
 ATP 1972 results
 ATP 1973 results

Defunct tennis tournaments in the United States
Carpet court tennis tournaments
Indoor tennis tournaments
Des Moines Open